Japanese ranks and insignia during World War II are listed on the following pages:
 Ranks of the Imperial Japanese Army
 Ranks of the Imperial Japanese Navy

Military history of Japan during World War II